Ostoja Mijailović (born 25 May 1979) is a Serbian entrepreneur, sports administrator, and politician. He has served in the National Assembly of Serbia since 2016 as a member of the Serbian Progressive Party.

Private career
An economist and entrepreneur based in Čačak, Mijailović is the owner and general manager of the Serbian company British Motors. He also served on the board of FK Partizan from May 2015 to April 2016, and in September 2017 he was appointed as the president of KK Partizan. In December 2017 he indicated that the latter organization was badly in debt and threatened by bankruptcy.

Political career
Mijailović was a member of New Serbia from 2000 to 2015. He served on the Čačak city council (i.e., the executive branch of the municipal government) with responsibility for small and medium-sized businesses and was at one time a prominent ally of mayor Vojislav Ilić, the brother of New Serbia leader Velimir Ilić. He left New Serbia to join the Progressive Party in 2015, choosing in the process to resign his seat on council on the grounds that he had been an appointee of his former party.

He received the 116th position on the Progressive Party's Aleksandar Vučić – Serbia Is Winning list in the 2016 Serbian parliamentary election and was elected when the list won a majority victory with 131 out of 250 mandates. He is currently a deputy member of the parliamentary committee on the [Serbian] diaspora and Serbs in the region; a deputy member of the committee on the economy, regional development, trade, tourism, and energy; and a member of the parliamentary friendship groups with Austria, China, Croatia, Cuba, Germany, Italy, Macedonia, Montenegro, Russia, Slovenia, Spain, and the United Kingdom.

References

1979 births
Living people
Politicians from Čačak
Members of the National Assembly (Serbia)
New Serbia politicians
Serbian basketball executives and administrators
Serbian Progressive Party politicians